Grand Burgher [male] or Grand Burgheress [female] (from German: Großbürger [male], Großbürgerin [female]) is a specific conferred or inherited title of medieval German origin and legally defined preeminent status granting exclusive constitutional privileges and legal rights (German: Großbürgerrecht), who were magnates and subordinate only to the Emperor, independent of feudalism and territorial nobility or lords paramount. A member class within the patrician ruling elite, the Grand Burgher was a type of urban citizen and social order of highest rank, a formally defined upper social class of affluent individuals and elite burgher families in medieval German-speaking city-states and towns under the Holy Roman Empire, who usually were of a wealthy business or significant mercantile background and estate. This hereditary title and influential constitutional status, privy to very few individuals and families across Central Europe, formally existed well into the late 19th century and early part of the 20th century. In autonomous German-speaking cities and towns of Central Europe that held a municipal charter, town privileges (German town law) or were a free imperial city such as Hamburg, Augsburg, Cologne and Bern that held imperial immediacy, where nobility had no power of authority or supremacy, the Grand Burghers (Großbürger) or patricians ("Patrizier") constituted the ruling class.

Hierarchy
 Since before the 15th century the group of legally coequal "burghers" started to split into three different groups: hereditary grand-burghers, ordinary burghers termed petty-burghers (German Kleinbürger or simply Bürger) made up largely of artisans, tradesman, business owners, merchants, shopkeepers and others who were obliged according to city or town constitution to acquire the ordinary petty-burghership, and non-burghers, the latter being merely "inhabitants" or otherwise resident aliens without specific legal rights in the territorial jurisdiction of a city or town and largely consisted of the working class, foreign or migrant workers and other civil employees who were neither able nor eligible to acquire the ordinary petty-burghership.

Burghership in general gave a person the right to exist in the territorial jurisdiction of the city-state or town of burghership, be an active member of its society, acquire real estate, pursue their specified economic activity or occupation, access social protection and participate in municipal affaires amongst many other exclusive constitutional rights, privileges, exemptions and immunities, especially that of the "grand" burghership (German: Großbürgerschaft).

Grand Burghers held rich historical and cultural roles created and expanded over the decades, including union with other families of the same eminent status and branches of nobility, Grand Burghers were often of such extraordinary wealth and significant economic importance that they far exceeded the wealth and influence of even the most highest-ranking members of nobility, the latter often sought inter-marriage with elite grand-burgher families to maintain their noble lifestyles. The names of the individuals and families is generally known in the city or town where they lived, and in many cases, their ancestors had contributed to regional history. The conferred grand-burghership was in most instances hereditary in both their male and female family descendants, and a hereditary title or rank stated as the person's occupation in records.

In Hamburg for example only the Grand Burghers were privileged to full unrestricted freedom of large-scale trade, including unrestricted foreign import and export trade, were allowed to entertain a bank account, as well as be elected to the Senate of Hamburg, amongst other privileges.

Confer of burghership
As with the administration expense for conferring letters patent to nobility, both types of burghership were also subject to expenses. The burghership expense in Hamburg in year 1600 was 50 Reichstaler for the grand and 7 Reichstaler for the petty burghership, in 1833 the initial expense for receiving grand burghership in Hamburg was 758 Mark 8 Schilling (Hamburg Mark); that of the petty burghership, 46 Mk 8 Sh. Other ways to become a Grand Burgher were to marry a grand burgher or, subject to meeting constitutional conditions, the daughter of a grand burgher born in the city or town. These rules varied locally.

German Revolution of 1918–19
Following the German Revolution of 1918–19, the German "Großbürger" along with German nobility as a legally defined class was abolished on August 11, 1919, with the promulgation of the Weimar Constitution, under which all Germans were made equal before the law, and the legal rights and privileges due to the Großbürger (Grand Burgher) and all ranks of nobility ceased. Any title, however, held prior to the Weimar Constitution, were permitted to continue merely as part of the family name and heritage, or erased from future name use. The Grand Burghers would nevertheless continue to retain their powerful economic significance, political authority and influence, as well as their personal status and importance in society, beyond the Weimar Constitution.

Other states, other developments
It seems that this medieval German concept has been taken over by other countries and cities. In Hamburg, hereditary grand and ordinary petty burghership were existing before 1600, and in like manner, France. In 1657 the Dutch council of New Netherland for example established criteria for the rights of burghers in New Amsterdam (present day New York City), distinguishing between "great" and "petty" burgher rights following the distinction made in this regard in Amsterdam 1652. In New Amsterdam during the mid-1600s, the ordinary petty-burghership was conferred at the administration expense of 20 Dutch florins, the hereditary great-burghership 50 fl. 1664 the concept was assumed by Beverwijck (present day Albany).

See also 
 Patrician (ancient Rome)
 Patrician (post-Roman Europe)
 Aristocracy (class)
 Gentry
 Hanseaten (class)
 Burgess (title)
 Bourgeoisie
 Bildungsbürgertum
 Estates of the realm
 Franklin (class)
 Junker
 Hereditary title
 Nobility
 National Liberal Party (Germany)

References

Further reading
 Lehrbuch des teutschen Privatrechts; Landrecht und Lehnrecht enthaltend. Vom Geheimen Rath Schmalz zu Berlin. Theodor von Schmalz, Berlin, 1818, bei Duncker und Humblot. Bayerische Staatsbibliothek in München. (English: Textbook of German Private Law; containing State Law and Feudal Law. By Privy Counsellor Schmalz of Berlin. Theodor von Schmalz, Berlin, 1818, Duncker and Humblot.), in German, Bavarian State Library in Munich.

Social class in Germany
Legal history of the Holy Roman Empire
Social history of the Holy Roman Empire
History of Hamburg
Hanseatic Cities
Medieval Germany
Titles
Noble titles
Men's social titles
Women's social titles